Bhimashankar Jyotirlinga (Dakinyam), Bhimpur, is a Hindu temple situated in the western part of the holy Mahendragiri mountains on the Mahendratanaya river in the Indian state of Odisha. It is debated to be the Dakini area and the Jyotirlingam found there is believed to be one among the 12 Jyotirlingams.

History 

According to Linga Purana written by Vedavyasa and as translated by Babaji Baishnaba Chrana Das in Odia, one of the 12 jyotirlingams is in Dakinye Bhima shankara. As described in Mahabharata and as believed by many historians, Dakini is between the western part of Mahendragiri river to Godavari river. It is believed that in the Dvadasha jyoritlinga strotram of Shankaracharya the words "Dakinyam Bhimasankara" refers to the Dakini area.

The specialty of the Jyotirlingam is the quadrangular Shakti around the Linga decorated by a Upavita as per the purana. This place came into light after it was excavated in the year 1974. The nearby Machha Diian (Jumping fish) waterfall in Mahendra tanaya river attract devotees as well as tourists throughout the year.

Geography 

References

External links 
 12 jyotirlingas of Shiva
 https://web.archive.org/web/20150208123842/http://bhimsankarjyotirling.org/contactus.htm
 

Hindu temples in Rayagada district
Jyotirlingas